Migraine surgery is a surgical operation undertaken with the goal of reducing or preventing migraines.  Migraine surgery most often refers to surgical decompression of one or several nerves in the head and neck which have been shown to trigger migraine symptoms in many migraine sufferers.  Following the development of nerve decompression techniques for the relief of migraine pain in the year 2000, these procedures have been extensively studied and shown to be effective in appropriate candidates.  The nerves that are most often addressed in migraine surgery are found outside of the skull, in the face and neck, and include the supra-orbital and supra-trochlear nerves in the forehead, the zygomaticotemporal nerve and auriculotemporal nerves in the temple region, and the greater occipital, lesser occipital, and third occipital nerves in the back of the neck.  Nerve impingement in the nasal cavity has additionally been shown to be a trigger of migraine symptoms.

Indications and patient selection
Migraine surgery is usually reserved for migraine patients who fail more conservative therapy or who cannot tolerate the side effects of drugs used to treat their migraines.  Appropriate patients are screened using injections of local anesthesia to provide a temporary nerve block. In some cases, Botox may be used to provide temporary decompression of the nerve.  Patients who respond to nerve blocks often see an immediate though temporary reduction in their pain by "shutting off" the nerve that is triggering the migraine, while pain relief following Botox injections is provided by relaxation of nearby muscle tissue that may be compressing the nerve.  Patients who respond well to these screening procedures are felt to be excellent candidates for migraine surgery.

Surgical procedures 
Migraine surgery is an outpatient procedure which addresses peripheral nerves through limited incisions.  Depending on the symptoms of the patient and the screening results following nerve blocks or Botox, different areas of the head and neck may be addressed to treat the nerves found to be the migraine trigger in a given patient.  Migraine surgery is always individualized to each patient's symptoms and anatomy.

Anterior nerves 
Nerves found in the forehead (supra-orbital and supra-trochlear nerves) are either addressed using endoscopic surgery or by using an incision in the crease of the upper eyelid.  Structures that are found pressing on the nerves here are released and may include bone at the upper orbit, fascia, blood vessels, or muscle tissue.  The supra-orbital and supra-trochlear nerves travel through the corrugator supercilii muscle which enables frowning of the brow.  These nerves are released from these muscles so they may lie free of pressure from these muscle structures. Small blood vessels which travel with these nerves may be divided to prevent pressure as well.  In the bony notch where these nerves exit the eye socket, small pieces of bone or connective tissue may be removed so undue pressure is not placed on the nerves in this region.

Nerves of the temple region 
The zygomaticotemporal nerve and auriculotemporal nerves are found in areas between the top of the ear and the lateral portion of the eye, in different areas of the temple.  These nerves can also be addressed by endoscopic techniques, or well hidden small incisions.  Blood vessels next to or crossing these nerves are often found to be the source of compression, and these blood vessels may be divided to prevent irritation of these nerves.  Associated temporal muscle release in the region of these nerves may also be indicated.  Because these nerves are very small and provide feeling to small regions of the scalp, they are often cut or avulsed, allowing the ends to retract into muscle tissue to prevent neuroma formation.

Posterior nerves 
Chronic irritation of the occipital nerves is called occipital neuralgia and is frequently the cause of migraine symptoms.  The greater occipital and third occipital nerves are addressed through an incision at the base of the scalp in the upper neck by either a vertical or transverse incision.  Incisions are usually placed within the hairline.  The greater occipital nerve travels through several muscle layers (including the trapezius muscle and splenius capitis muscle) where it is often compressed, and therefore surgery for this nerve involves releasing it from tight muscle and fascia in the upper neck.  Blood vessels found crossing the nerve such as the occipital artery may be divided in order to avoid chronic pressure and irritation of the greater occipital nerve.  The third occipital nerve is a small nerve that travels near the greater occipital nerve and may treated similarly in order to alleviate chronic irritation.

The lesser occipital nerve is a small nerve that has additionally been found to be associated with migraine pain.  This nerve is found near the sternocleidomastoid muscle and may be decompressed or divided here through a small incision.  As this small nerve provides feeling for a small region of the scalp, the minimal numbness resulting from the division of this nerve often goes un-noticed.

Nerves of the nose 
The nerves of the nasal lining may be impinged by structures in the nose such as the nasal septum and turbinates.  Nasal surgery to decompress these regions may include septoplasty, turbinectomy, or other rhinoplasty procedures.

Surgical outcomes 
Though initially thought to be experimental surgery, the benefits of migraine surgery have now been well documented.  Followup data has shown that 88% of migraine surgery patients experienced a positive response to the procedure after 5 years.  29% of patients have been shown to achieve complete elimination of their migraine disease, while an additional 59% of patients reported a significant decrease in their pain and symptoms 5 years following their migraine surgery.  12% of patients undergoing migraine surgery reported no change in their symptoms after 5 years.

Migraine surgery has additionally been studied in a socioeconomic context and has been shown to reduce both direct and indirect costs associated with migraine disease. Such costs after migraine surgery have been shown to be reduced by a median of $3,949 per patient per year.

References 

Migraine
Neurosurgery